The Milan Biennial IV was the fourth biennial, and like the earlier ones was organised by the Istituto Superiore per le Industrie Artistiche (ISIA) and held in Monza at the Royal Villa of Monza. It was called the International Exhibition of Modern Decorative and Industrial Arts, a change in name from the earlier three, and had an increased scope including architecture.
It and ran from 11 May to 2 November 1930.

References 

1930 in Italy
Monza
World's fairs in Italy